Sweet Diva may refer to:

 Sweet Diva, a fictional Japanese idol group from the manga Wanna Be the Strongest in the World
 Sweet Diva, the international English title of the Brazilian telenovela A Dona do Pedaço